Rainel Rosario (born March 29, 1989) is a Dominican professional baseball outfielder for the Uni-President 7-Eleven Lions of the Chinese Professional Baseball League. He played in Nippon Professional Baseball (NPB) for the Hiroshima Toyo Carp.

Career

St. Louis Cardinals
Rosario signed with the St. Louis Cardinals organization as an international free agent in 2006 and made his professional debut for the GCL Cardinals. He played the 2007 and 2008 seasons with the rookie ball GCL Cardinals, batting .096 and .243 respectively. In 2009, Rosario played for the rookie ball Johnson City Cardinals, batting .272/.350/.408 in 36 contests. He split the 2010 season between the Low-A Batavia Muckdogs and the Single-A Quad Cities River Bandits, accumulating a .284/.387/.507 batting line in 64 games. He spent the next year with the High-A Palm Beach Cardinals, slashing .270/.333/.398 with 9 home runs and 70 RBI in 122 games. He split 2012 between Palm Beach and the Double-A Springfield Cardinals, batting .213/.282/.288 in 121 games between the clubs. On November 2, 2012, Rosario elected free agency.

Hiroshima Toyo Carp
Rosario played the 2014 and '15 seasons in Japan for the Hiroshima Toyo Carp of Nippon Professional Baseball. He appeared in a total of 111 games, batting .309 with 16 home runs and 61 RBIs. in two seasons for Hiroshima, Rosario batted .309/.370/.503 with 16 home runs and 61 RBI.

Boston Red Sox
On December 12, 2015 he signed a minor league contract with the Boston Red Sox and was assigned to their AA affiliate, the Portland Sea Dogs, to start the 2016 season. He split the year between Portland and the Triple-A Pawtucket Red Sox, batting .248 in 103 games between the two clubs before electing free agency on November 7, 2016.

Saraperos de Saltillo
On March 30, 2017, Rosario signed with the Saraperos de Saltillo of the Mexican League. In 2017, Rosario batted a stellar .331/.406/.472 with 26 home runs and 104 RBI in 108 games. He played the entire 2018 season with the Saraperos, hitting 10 home runs with 50 RBI. In 2019, Rosario played in 114 games for Saltillo, slashing .324/.407/.569 with 28 home runs and 91 RBI. Rosario did not play in a game in 2020 due to the cancellation of the Mexican League season because of the COVID-19 pandemic.

Uni-President 7-Eleven Lions
On August 12, 2022, Rosario signed with the Uni-President 7-Eleven Lions of the Chinese Professional Baseball League.

References

External links

1989 births
Living people
Águilas Cibaeñas players
Batavia Muckdogs players
Dominican Republic expatriate baseball players in Japan
Dominican Republic expatriate baseball players in Mexico
Dominican Republic expatriate baseball players in the United States
Dominican Summer League Cardinals players
Gulf Coast Cardinals players
Hiroshima Toyo Carp players
Johnson City Cardinals players

Leones del Escogido players
Mexican League baseball first basemen
Mexican League baseball right fielders
Nippon Professional Baseball outfielders
Palm Beach Cardinals players
Pawtucket Red Sox players
Portland Sea Dogs players
Quad Cities River Bandits players
Saraperos de Saltillo players
Springfield Cardinals players
Tomateros de Culiacán players